Starry Starry Night may refer to:

 Starry, Starry Night (album), a 2001 album by Don McLean
 "Starry, starry night", the opening line of Don McLean's 1971 song "Vincent", often referred to by that name 
 Starry Starry Night (film), a 2011 Taiwanese film

See also 
 Starry Night (disambiguation)